Statistics of Bahraini Premier League in the 1967–68 season.

Overview
Bahrain Club won the championship.

References
RSSSF

Bahraini Premier League seasons
Bah
1967–68 in Bahraini football